Esporte Clube Mundo Novo, commonly known as just Mundo Novo, is a Brazilian professional football club based in Três Coroas, Rio Grande do Sul, founded on August 24, 1934, their colors being blue and white. Currently has no professional team, which has had in the last century, having played Campeonato Gaúcho Segunda Divisão (third state division) during the 60s, 70s and 80s. His best performance was in 1981, when it was runner-up. In previous decades, also competed in the now defunct Campeonato Citadino de Taquara (municipal championship). There are plans to re-activate the professional team in 2017.

Currently playing only academy championships, being his most important team the under-17s squad, which currently plays in the second division of Campeonato Gaúcho Sub-17.

Honours

State
Campeonato Gaúcho Segunda Divisão: 0
Runner-up: 1981

Club officials
 President: Rogério Faiffer
 Vice-president: Rodrigo Viacava
 Director of football: Orneide Tondin
 Director of marketing: Nico
 Supervisor: Guto
 Head coach: Márcio Abreu
 Assistant coach: Roger Lima
 Fitness coach: Sydmar
 Goalkeeper coach: Felipe Padilha
 Massagist: Cléo Magero

References

External links
Esporte Clube Mundo Novo profile. Cacellain.

Football clubs in Rio Grande do Sul
Association football clubs established in 1934
1934 establishments in Brazil